, was the second daimyō of Matsumae Domain in Ezo-chi, (Hokkaidō), Japan, in the early Edo period. Holding this position from 1617 until his death in 1641, he was successor to Matsumae Yoshihiro and followed by Matsumae Ujihiro.

Names
His given name Kinhiro may also be read Kimihiro.

Biography
His father died in Keichō 13 (1608). In Keichō 18 (1613), he received audiences with Tokugawa Hidetada and Tokugawa Ieyasu, and the following year was invested with Junior Fifth Court Rank, Lower Grade and the title . After the death of his grandfather Yoshihiro in 1616, Matsumae Kinhiro was confirmed as daimyō in Genna 2 (1617).

In 1617, prospectors using placer methods began to extract gold from local streams in the south of the Oshima Peninsula. In 1620, Kinhiro presented a hundred ryō of gold dust to the bakufu, Doi Toshikatsu and Aoyama Tadatoshi conferring rights to its continued gathering and to new gold mining operations on the island in return.

These years were also marked by the development of the town below Matsumae Castle, extending down to the sea and supplanting the earlier centre to the north around Ōdate and the temple district. In the third month of 1637, the predecessor of today's Matsumae Castle went up in flames, with the loss of innumerable family treasures and documents, and Kinhiro himself hurt; it was rebuilt two years later.

Despite earlier tolerance, his final years brought persecution of Christianity, in line with the Shogunate's clampdown. Already in 1613, a Christian physician had been brought over to tend to an ailing lord, most likely Matsumae Yoshihiro. When Jerome de Angelis arrived in 1618, Kinhiro took no action, but after his departure he banned inhabitants of the domain from practising the faith. Registers were compiled of current and former Christians, and attempts were made to persuade adherents to abandon their beliefs.

Kinhiro himself died on the eighth day of the seventh month of Kan'ei 18 (1641), at the age of 44 according to traditional age reckoning, after composing a death poem.

See also
 Takeda Nobuhiro
 Shinra no Kiroku
 Kitamaebune
 Ichirizuka

References

Daimyo
Matsumae clan
1598 births
1641 deaths